Ronald Allen Flatter (born April 9, 1959) is an American and Australian radio broadcaster based in New York City. He is currently a reporter and anchor for the Vegas Stats & Information Network (VSiN). He is also a contributing reporter for radio station RSN927 in Melbourne, Australia. Flatter is of no relation to the musician and DJ by the same name who is based in Germany.

Broadcasting
Growing up in Chico, California, Flatter became a part-time TV sports reporter at Chico's KHSL shortly after his first assignment was calling and producing an NASL exhibition soccer match in March 1976 between the San Jose Earthquakes and Dallas Tornado when he was 16 years old.

He studied at Butte College and moved from KHSL to small-market radio and newspaper jobs in Utah, Arizona, and California. Most of these were sports assignments, but Flatter occasionally handled news duties.

In 1989, he got his first major-market job, working for the Pasadena Star-News, covering LA college, pro, and prep sports. He was also hired as a producer by Los Angeles  radio station KMPC when it switched to an all sports format.

In 1992 Flatter moved to Bristol, Connecticut, to start work as a producer, production manager, and creative director in two separate stints with ESPN Radio (1992–95 and 1998–2004).

Flatter became an air personality at sports stations in Miami (1995–96) and Austin, Texas (1996–98).

Following a visit to Australia, he moved from the US to Melbourne to become Sport 927's Editor of International Sport from 2004 to 2007. He still contributes radio and web features for the station from the Super Bowl and from major horse races in the U.S. and Europe.

With his Australian work visa set to expire, Flatter returned to the States in early 2007 to begin a career as a freelance broadcaster and sportswriter in Manhattan.

In the same year, 1050 ESPN Radio, now WEPN (1050 AM, "ESPN New York") made Flatter its lead weekend anchor. In October 2009, he became the station's weekday morning anchor, delivering local SportsCenter updates during the network's Mike and Mike in the Morning program. In March 2010, Flatter was assigned to anchor updates within The Seth Everett Show, The Herd and McDonald & Tierney, an assignment that carried to the expiration of his contract in September 2010. In November 2010, Flatter was named one of the permanent anchors of Fox News Radio's national newscasts. His role at Fox included reporting from the field for certain sports events that are considered worthy of attention within the network's regular newscasts. Flatter had served as a substitute anchor for the network since January 2008.

He has covered the Kentucky Derby since 2007 as a paddock reporter for ESPN Radio, which won an Eclipse Award for its 2009 broadcast.

Flatter covered the 2010 FIFA World Cup in South Africa, both for ESPN Sports Radio in the US and Sport 927 in Australia.

Additional Flatter assignments have included the Summer Olympic Games in Los Angeles (1984), and Winter Olympics both in Salt Lake City (2002) and Vancouver (2010).
In 2000, Flatter produced a baseball feature for ESPN Radio that went on to earn the network an RTNDA Edward R. Murrow Award for Use of Sound.

In 2011, he continues to get noticed in the media both in Australia and the United States, as an item in the Jan. 2, 2011 Melbourne Age mentioned Flatter's adventures getting to work through the Manhattan blizzard that week, writing: "Ron Flatter, a news anchor at [Fox News Radio] and sports correspondent for [Sport 927], found himself fighting Antarctic-like conditions on the way to work in Manhattan the last week."

Early in 2015 Flatter was moved to overnights before his contract was bought out that summer by Fox. He then began free-lance work at CBS Radio, New York, serving first as a sports anchor at WFAN and CBS Sports Radio and adding news-anchor duties in late 2015 at 1010 WINS.

When VSiN was launched in early 2017, Brent Musburger assumed the role of managing editor and recommended the hiring of Flatter, who worked as his producer on ESPN Radio's “SportsBeat” from 1993 to 2004. Flatter first appeared on VSiN from Super Bowl LI in Houston during the network's preview program Feb. 5, 2017. After he and his wife moved to Las Vegas, Flatter was Musburger's co-host and substitute on “My Guys in the Desert” from its debut Feb. 27, 2017, until early 2018. He has since become VSiN's chief update anchor both on the network and in material packaged for use on terrestrial stations around the U.S. Flatter also writes a horse-racing column and, since October 2017, has hosted the “Ron Flatter Racing Pod” for VSiN.com via Apple Podcasts, Google Play Podcasts and Stitcher.

Flatter has covered the Kentucky Derby every year since 2007, including three years as a paddock reporter for ESPN Radio, which won an Eclipse Award for its 2009 broadcast. He has also covered every Triple Crown race and Breeders' Cup since 2007 and every Prix de l'Arc de Triomphe and Arlington Million since 2008. Flatter also covered the 2010 FIFA World Cup in South Africa, both for ESPN Radio and RSN927.

Additional assignments for Flatter have included the Summer Olympic Games in Los Angeles (1984), and Winter Olympics both in Salt Lake City (2002) and Vancouver (2010) plus coverage of Usain Bolt’s world records in the IAAF World Championships at Berlin (2009). In 2000 Flatter produced a baseball feature for ESPN Radio that went on to earn the network an RTNDA Edward R. Murrow Award for Use of Sound.

Game show contestant

Flatter has also been a contestant on the TV shows Scrabble, Wheel of Fortune, and The Weakest Link. Flatter won $80,500 on the latter, when his opponent failed to answer this question from host Anne Robinson: “What word for a machine that performs human tasks literally translates to the Czech term for `compulsory labor’?” The man answered “automaton,” but the correct response is robot.

Here's a Facebook clip of Flatter winning $80,500 on The Weakest Link (US).

Cricket throwing controversy
Flatter broke a story involving the examination of how one controversial cricket star delivers what would be the equivalent of a baseball pitch. This particular cricket story made headlines worldwide in November 2004, following a phone interview Flatter conducted with the Sri Lankan bowler Muttiah Muralitharan, who argued that three Australian players (Jason Gillespie, Brett Lee, and Glenn McGrath) most likely were regularly breaking soon-to-be updated rules against throwing. Cricket bowlers are not allowed to flex their elbows. If they do they are called for throwing - something Muralitharan has a reputation for doing. His point about the Aussies was that the speed of the game had advanced to such a point that the umpires’ naked eyes could no longer be trusted to accurately judge the rule, and that the electronic eye should be the game’s final arbiter in these cases.

The Australian Football Association of North America wrote about Flatter and the Muralitharan story, and mentions a story from the Herald Sun newspaper in Australia about Flatter's work.

Lawsuit controversy
Without being a named defendant, Flatter was the centerpiece of evidence used in a lawsuit filed against Fox News in U.S. District Court, Southern District of New York. Kathleen Lee, a shift editor at Fox News Radio, claimed that Flatter "regularly berated and intimidated her, made fun of her disability, and disparaged other female employees." In a June 2, 2017, letter filed with Fox's attorneys at Dechert LLP, Flatter said that he "adamantly den(ied) the allegations that have been made against me by Ms. Lee. ... The allegations against me are baseless, fabricated, and are being pursued for an apparent ulterior motive." The case was discontinued Aug. 21, 2017.

References

External links
 ESPN Search page for Ron Flatter
 ESPN Radio FIFA World Cup listings, including Ron Flatter
 USA TODAY feature on 2010 Breeder's Cup and Zenyatta that quotes Ron Flatter

ESPN Radio
American radio personalities
Living people
1959 births
People from San Rafael, California
People from Chico, California
Radio personalities from Melbourne